The term illusory motion, also known as motion illusion, is an optical illusion in which a static image appears to be moving due to the cognitive effects of interacting color contrasts, object shapes, and position. Apparent motion is the most common type of illusory motion and is perceived when images are displayed in succession at a specific frame rate such as in a movie. The concept was allegedly first identified by Aristotle.

Types of illusory motion
Induced movement works by moving the background around a fixed object. Films such as Airplane! and Top Secret! use a fixed prop and move the background props to give the effect of induced motion.

Motion aftereffect occurs when one views moving stimuli for an extended period of time and then focus on a stationary object.  The object will appear to move in the opposite direction of the moving stimuli.

Mechanics of illusory motion perception 
Illusory motion is perceived as movement in a number of ways. The first can manifest through the retinal image where the motion flows across the retinal mosaic. The perceived motion can also manifest by the eyes changing position. In either case, an aftereffect may occur.  Peripheral drift illusion is another variety of perceived movement in the eye.

Using an fMRI, Roger B. H. Tootell et al. were able to identify the area of the brain that is active when experiencing illusory motion.  Tootell and his colleagues had participants view a set of concentric rings that would appear to move inward and outward.  Participants would experience a motion aftereffect following the viewing the moving stimuli for 40 seconds. Participants showed an increased activity in the MT area of the brain.

Occurrences
Illusory motion can occur in different circumstances. Stroboscopic images is where a series of static images are viewed in sequence at a high enough rate that the static images appear to blend into a continuous motion. An example of this is a motion picture. Optical art (or Op art.) is when artists use simple black and white patterns that create vivid illusions of motion, which are known as optical flow.

Stroboscopic images
Rotating objects can appear counter-rotating, stationary, or rotating under a strobe light.   The apparent counter-rotation of wheels can also occur in daylight. Because of the illusion of counter-rotation in constant light, it is reasonable to assume that the eye views the world in a series of still images, and therefore the counter-rotation is a result of under-sampling (aliasing).

There is, however, a strong counter-argument to this theory.  A simple demonstration to disprove the idea is to view an apparent counter-rotation (that of a rotating drum) in mirror image. Subjective reports reveal that the counter-rotation appears in only one of the images (either the real or mirrored image when both are viewed simultaneously).

Optical art
Apparent motion in optical art has been suggested to be caused by the difference in neural signals between black and white parts of an image. While white parts may produce an "on-off" signal, the black parts produce an "off-on" signal. This means for a black part and a white part presented simultaneously, the "on" part of the signal is separated in time, possibly resulting in the stimulation of motion detectors.

Another explanation is that afterimages from the retina cause a moiré that is hard to identify.

Gallery

In popular culture
American neo-psychedelia outfit Animal Collective used an illusory motion on the cover of their award-winning 2009 album Merriweather Post Pavilion.

The Rotating Snakes illusion by Akiyoshi Kitaoka is one of the most popularly known illusory motions.

See also
Akiyoshi Kitaoka
Illusions of self-motion

References

External links
 These Patterns Move, But it’s an Illusion  by Smithsonian Research Lab
 Akiyoshi illusion pages by the Professor Akiyoshi Kitaoka, Ristumeikan University, Osaka, Japan

Optical illusions